The 2017–18 Los Angeles Clippers season was the 48th season of the franchise in the National Basketball Association (NBA), their 40th season in Southern California, and their 34th season in Los Angeles. Two-time Executive Of The Year winner Jerry West would join the Clippers as a special consultant.

For the first time since 2011, Chris Paul was not on the roster as he was traded to the Houston Rockets in the off-season in exchange for Patrick Beverley, Lou Williams, Sam Dekker, Montrezl Harrell, Darrun Hilliard, DeAndre Liggins, Kyle Wiltjer, a first round pick next year, and cash. Head coach Doc Rivers would also relinquish his role as a President of Basketball Operations for the team on August 4, with the role being replaced by Lawrence Frank.

On January 28, 2018, the Clippers traded their franchise cornerstone and 2009 1st overall pick Blake Griffin to the Detroit Pistons alongside Brice Johnson and Willie Reed for Tobias Harris, Avery Bradley, Boban Marjanović, and two draft picks, effectively ending the Lob City era.

On April 1, 2018, the Clippers streak of 50 or more wins since the 2012-13 season came to an end with a loss to the Indiana Pacers.

With a loss to the Denver Nuggets on April 7, 2018, the Clippers were eliminated from playoff contention for the first time since the 2010–11 season.

Following this season, Austin Rivers was traded to the Washington Wizards in exchange for Marcin Gortat.

This was also DeAndre Jordan's last season as a Clipper. After 10 years of being on the team, on July 6, 2018, DeAndre signed a one-year deal with the Dallas Mavericks.

Draft

The Clippers did not have a pick in the 2017 NBA Draft, but acquired both the Philadelphia 76ers' 39th pick, Jawun Evans out of  Oklahoma State, and Milwaukee Bucks' 48th pick, Sindarius Thornwell out of South Carolina, for cash considerations.

Roster

 

<noinclude>

Roster notes
 Guard Lou Williams becomes the 27th former Laker to play for the crosstown rival Clippers.

Standings

Division

By Conference

Game log

Preseason 

|- style="background:#fcc;"
| 1
| October 1
| @ Toronto
| 
| Blake Griffin (18)
| DeAndre Jordan (9)
| Miloš Teodosić (8)
| Stan Sheriff Center8,018
| 0–1
|- style="background:#cfc;"
| 2
| October 4
| Toronto
| 
| Blake Griffin (17)
| DeAndre Jordan (8)
| Miloš Teodosić (5)
| Stan Sheriff Center8,272
| 1–1
|- style="background:#fcc;"
| 3
| October 8
| Portland
| 
|  Griffin, Teodosić (15)
| DeAndre Jordan (14)
| Beverley, Griffin (6)
| Staples Center13,278
| 1–2
|- style="background:#cfc;"
| 4
| October 12
| Sacramento
| 
| Blake Griffin (18)
| DeAndre Jordan (14)
| Miloš Teodosić (6)
| Staples Center11,225
| 2–2
|- style="background:#fcc;"
| 5
| October 13
| L.A. Lakers
| 
| Tyrone Wallace (23)
| Brice Johnson (10)
| Jawun Evans (8)
| Staples Center16,711
| 2–3

Regular season

|- style="background:#cfc;"
| 1
| October 19
| @ LA Lakers
| 
| Blake Griffin (29)
| DeAndre Jordan (24)
| Miloš Teodosić (6)
| Staples Center18,997
| 1–0
|- style="background:#cfc;"
| 2
| October 21
| Phoenix
| 
| Blake Griffin (29)
| DeAndre Jordan (13)
| Lou Williams (6)
| Staples Center19,068
| 2–0
|- style="background:#cfc;"
| 3
| October 24
| Utah
| 
| Blake Griffin (22)
| DeAndre Jordan (18)
| Blake Griffin (6)
| Staples Center16,607
| 3–0
|- style="background:#cfc;"
| 4
| October 26
| @ Portland
| 
| Blake Griffin (25)
| DeAndre Jordan (18)
| Blake Griffin (5)
| Moda Center18,694
| 4–0
|- style="background:#fcc;"
| 5
| October 28
| Detroit
| 
| Austin Rivers (20)
| DeAndre Jordan (18)
| Patrick Beverley (8)
| Staples Center17,247
| 4–1
|- style="background:#fcc;"
| 6 
| October 30
| Golden State
| 
| Danilo Gallinari (19)
| DeAndre Jordan (11)
| Beverley, Gallinari, Griffin (4)
| Staples Center19,068
| 4–2

|- style="background:#cfc;"
| 7
| November 1
| Dallas
| 
| Blake Griffin (20)
| DeAndre Jordan (9)
| Blake Griffin (7)
| Staples Center13,487
| 5–2
|- style="background:#fcc;"
| 8
| November 4
| Memphis
| 
| Blake Griffin (30)
| Blake Griffin (11)
| Danilo Gallinari (6)
| Staples Center14,777
| 5–3
|- style="background:#fcc;"
| 9
| November 5
| Miami
| 
| Blake Griffin (23)
| DeAndre Jordan (19)
| Blake Griffin (4)
| Staples Center15,676
| 5–4
|- style="background:#fcc;"
| 10
| November 7
| @ San Antonio
| 
| Austin Rivers (24)
| Blake Griffin (9)
| Blake Griffin (6)
| AT&T Center18,418
| 5–5
|- style="background:#fcc;"
| 11
| November 10
| @ Oklahoma City
| 
| Lou Williams (35)
| DeAndre Jordan (12)
| Blake Griffin (5)
| Chesapeake Energy Arena18,203
| 5–6
|- style="background:#fcc;"
| 12
| November 11
| @ New Orleans
| 
| Blake Griffin (26)
| DeAndre Jordan (14)
| Blake Griffin (6)
| Smoothie King Center17,624
| 5–7
|- style="background:#fcc;"
| 13
| November 13
| Philadelphia
| 
| Blake Griffin (26)
| Lou Williams (7)
| Lou Williams (6)
| Staples Center19,068
| 5–8
|- style="background:#fcc;"
| 14
| November 17
| @ Cleveland
| 
| Blake Griffin (23)
| DeAndre Jordan (22)
| Austin Rivers (6)
| Quicken Loans Arena20,562
| 5–9
|- style="background:#fcc;"
| 15
| November 18
| @ Charlotte
| 
| Lou Williams (25)
| DeAndre Jordan (14)
| Griffin, Williams (4)
| Spectrum Center17,640
| 5–10
|- style="background:#fcc;"
| 16
| November 20
| @ New York
| 
| Blake Griffin (21)
| DeAndre Jordan (9)
| Griffin, Rivers (5)
| Madison Square Garden18,848
| 5–11
|- style="background:#cfc;"
| 17
| November 22
| @ Atlanta
| 
| Blake Griffin (26)
| DeAndre Jordan (16)
| Blake Griffin (10)
| Philips Arena12,675
| 6–11
|- style="background:#cfc;"
| 18
| November 25
| @ Sacramento
| 
| Blake Griffin (33)
| DeAndre Jordan (16)
| Lou Williams (8)
| Golden 1 Center17,583
| 7–11
|- style="background:#cfc;"
| 19
| November 27
| LA Lakers
| 
| Lou Williams (42)
| Blake Griffin (11)
| Griffin, Rivers (6)
| Staples Center18,086
| 8–11
|- style="background:#fcc;"
| 20
| November 30
| Utah
| 
| Austin Rivers (25)
| DeAndre Jordan (16)
| Austin Rivers (6)
| Staples Center15,139
| 8–12

|- style=background:#fcc;"
| 21
| December 2
| @ Dallas
| 
| Lou Williams (18)
| DeAndre Jordan (18)
| Lou Williams (6)
| American Airlines Center19,245
| 8–13
|- style="background:#fcc;"
| 22
| December 3
| @ Minnesota
| 
| Austin Rivers (30)
| DeAndre Jordan (12)
| Lou Williams (10)
| Target Center13,172
| 8–14
|- style="background:#fcc;"
| 23
| December 6
| Minnesota
| 
| Rivers, Williams (26)
| DeAndre Jordan (21)
| Lou Williams (8)
| Staples Center15,951
| 8–15
|-style="background:#cfc;"
| 24
| December 9
| Washington
| 
| Lou Williams (35)
| DeAndre Jordan (17)
| Lou Williams (8)
| Staples Center15,739
| 9–15
|- style="background:#cfc;"
| 25
| December 11
| Toronto
| 
| Harrell, Williams (17)
| DeAndre Jordan (17)
| Lou Williams (5)
| Staples Center16,658
| 10–15
|- style="background:#cfc;"
| 26
| December 13
| @ Orlando
| 
| Lou Williams (31)
| DeAndre Jordan (20)
| Lou Williams (8)
| Amway Center16,011
| 11–15
|- style="background:#fcc;"
| 27
| December 15
| @ Washington
| 
| Lou Williams (23)
| DeAndre Jordan (16)
| Jawun Evans (6)
| Capital One Arena15,442
| 11–16
|- style="background:#fcc;"
| 28
| December 16
| @ Miami
| 
| Montrezl Harrell (15)
| DeAndre Jordan (20)
| Lou Williams (7)
| American Airlines Arena19,600
| 11–17
|- style="background:#fcc;"
| 29
| December 18
| @ San Antonio
| 
| Wilson, Jordan (13)
| DeAndre Jordan (14)
| Milos Teodosic (5)
| AT&T Center18,418
| 11–18
|- style="background:#cfc;"
| 30
| December 20
| Phoenix
| 
| Austin Rivers (21)
| DeAndre Jordan (20)
| Milos Teodosic (8)
| Staples Center18,995
| 12–18
|- style="background:#cfc;"
| 31
| December 22
| @ Houston
| 
| Austin Rivers (36)
| DeAndre Jordan (20)
| Rivers, Williams (7)
| Toyota Center17,373
| 13–18
|- style="background:#fcc;"
| 32
| December 23
| @ Memphis
| 
| Austin Rivers (38)
| DeAndre Jordan (18)
| Milos Teodosic (4)
| FedExForum16,844
| 13–19
|- style="background:#cfc;"
| 33
| December 26
| Sacramento
| 
| Montrezl Harrell (22)
| DeAndre Jordan (15)
| Miloš Teodosić (10)
| Staples Center19,099
| 14–19
|- style="background:#cfc;"
| 34
| December 29
| @ L.A. Lakers
| 
| Blake Griffin (24)
| DeAndre Jordan (16)
| Miloš Teodosić (7)
| Staples Center18,997
| 15–19
|- style="background:#cfc;"
| 35
| December 31
| Charlotte
| 
| Lou Williams (40)
| DeAndre Jordan (16)
| Lou Williams (8)
| Staples Center19,099
| 16–19

|- style="background:#cfc;"
| 36
| January 2
| Memphis
| 
| Lou Williams (33)
| DeAndre Jordan (9)
| Blake Griffin (8)
| Staples Center15,711
| 17–19
|- style="background:#fcc;"
| 37
| January 4
| Oklahoma City
| 
| Jordan, Williams (26)
| DeAndre Jordan (17)
| Lou Williams (10) 
| Staples Center19,068
| 17–20
|- style="background:#fcc;"
| 38
| January 6
| Golden State
| 
| Lou Williams (23)
| DeAndre Jordan (11)
| Jawun Evans (7)
| Staples Center19,068
| 17–21
|- style="background:#cfc;"
| 39
| January 8
| Atlanta
| 
| Lou Williams (34)
| DeAndre Jordan (18)
| Evans, Williams (4)
| Staples Center14,624
| 18–21
|- style="background:#cfc;"
| 40
| January 10
| @ Golden State
| 
| Lou Williams (50)
| DeAndre Jordan (12)
| Lou Williams (7)
| Oracle Arena19,596
| 19–21
|- style="background:#cfc;"
| 41
| January 11
| @ Sacramento
| 
| Lou Williams (30)
| Blake Griffin (12)
| Milos Teodosic (9)
| Golden 1 Center17,583
| 20–21
|- style="background:#cfc;"
| 42
| January 13
| Sacramento
| 
| Lou Williams (26)
| Willie Reed (13)
| Blake Griffin (9)
| Staples Center16,656
| 21–21
|-style="background:#cfc;"
| 43
| January 15
| Houston
| 
| Lou Williams (26)
| Wesley Johnson (12)
| Lou Williams (9)
| Staples Center17,622
| 22–21
|-style="background:#cfc;"
| 44
| January 17
| Denver
| 
| Blake Griffin (20)
| Blake Griffin (12)
| Teodosic, Williams (5)
| Staples Center15,043
| 23–21
|- style="background:#fcc;"
| 45
| January 20
| @ Utah
| 
| Lou Williams (31)
| Griffin, Johnson (8)
| Lou Williams (7)
| Vivint Smart Home Arena18,306
| 23–22
|- style="background:#fcc;"
| 46
| January 22
| Minnesota
| 
| Blake Griffin (32)
| Blake Griffin (12)
| Blake Griffin (12)
| Staples Center16,347
| 23–23
|-style="background:#fcc;"
| 47
| January 24
| Boston
| 
| Blake Griffin (23)
| DeAndre Jordan (14)
| Lou Williams (7)
| Staples Center19,430
| 23–24
|- style="background:#cfc;"
| 48
| January 26
| @ Memphis
| 
| Lou Williams (40)
| DeAndre Jordan (9)
| Lou Williams (10)
| FedExForum16,369
| 24–24
|- style="background:#cfc;"
| 49
| January 28
| @ New Orleans
| 
| Blake Griffin (27)
| DeAndre Jordan (19)
| Blake Griffin (7)
| Smoothie King Center16,378
| 25–24
|-style="background:#fcc;"
| 50
| January 30
| Portland
| 
| Lou Williams (20)
| DeAndre Jordan (19)
| Lou Williams (5)
| Staples Center16,705
| 25–25

|-style="background:#cfc;"
| 51
| February 3
| Chicago
| 
| Gallinari, Harris (24)
| DeAndre Jordan (16)
| Lou Williams (6)
| Staples Center19,068
| 26–25
|-style="background:#cfc;"
| 52
| February 5
| Dallas
| 
| Danilo Gallinari (28)
| DeAndre Jordan (13)
| Lou Williams (8)
| Staples Center15,127
| 27–25
|- style="background:#cfc;"
| 53
| February 9
| @ Detroit
| 
| Lou Williams (26)
| DeAndre Jordan (17)
| Lou Williams (6)
| Little Caesars Arena16,697
| 28–25
|- style="background:#fcc;"
| 54
| February 10
| @ Philadelphia
| 
| Lou Williams (23)
| DeAndre Jordan (21)
| Lou Williams (6)
| Wells Fargo Center20,504
| 28–26
|- style="background:#cfc;"
| 55
| February 12
| @ Brooklyn
| 
| Lou Williams (20)
| DeAndre Jordan (17)
| Rivers, Williams (4)
| Barclays Center13,735
| 29–26
|- style="background:#cfc;"
| 56
| February 14
| @ Boston
| 
| DeAndre Jordan (30)
| DeAndre Jordan (13)
| Lou Williams (6)
| TD Garden18,624
| 30–26
|- style="background:#fcc;"
| 57
| February 22
| @ Golden State
| 
| Tobias Harris (22)
| DeAndre Jordan (14)
| Lou Williams (12)
| Oracle Arena19,596
| 30–27
|- style="background:#cfc;"
| 58
| February 23
| @ Phoenix
| 
| Lou Williams (35)
| DeAndre Jordan (13)
| Austin Rivers (6)
| Talking Stick Resort Arena17,126
| 31–27
|- style="background:#cfc;"
| 59
| February 27
| @ Denver
| 
| Lou Williams (25)
| DeAndre Jordan (9)
| Lou Williams (6)
| Pepsi Center15,004
| 32–27
|-style="background:#fcc;"
| 60
| February 28
| Houston
| 
| Tobias Harris (24)
| DeAndre Jordan (16)
| Rivers, Teodosic (4)
| Staples Center19,068
| 32–28

|-style="background:#cfc;"
| 61
| March 2
| NY Knicks
| 
| Lou Williams (19)
| DeAndre Jordan (20)
| Lou Williams (8)
| Staples Center17,190
| 33–28
|-style="background:#cfc;"
| 62
| March 4
| Brooklyn
| 
| Austin Rivers (27)
| DeAndre Jordan (15)
| Teodosic, L. Williams (4)
| Staples Center16,384
| 34–28
|-style="background:#fcc;"
| 63
| March 6
| New Orleans
| 
| Tobias Harris (27)
| DeAndre Jordan (20)
| Lou Williams (11)
| Staples Center16,412
| 34–29
|-style="background:#cfc;"
| 64
| March 9
| Cleveland
| 
| Tobias Harris (23)
| DeAndre Jordan (23)
| Lou Williams (7)
| Staples Center19,130
| 35–29
|-style="background:#cfc;"
| 65
| March 10
| Orlando
| 
| Lou Williams (25)
| DeAndre Jordan (18)
| Milos Teodosic (7)
| Staples Center16,561
| 36–29
|- style="background:#cfc;"
| 66
| March 13
| @ Chicago
| 
| DeAndre Jordan (29)
| DeAndre Jordan (18)
| Austin Rivers (6)
| United Center20,912
| 37–29
|- style="background:#fcc;"
| 67
| March 15
| @ Houston
| 
| Tobias Harris (29)
| DeAndre Jordan (18)
| Milos Teodosic (4)
| Toyota Center18,055
| 37–30
|- style="background:#fcc;"
| 68
| March 16
| @ Oklahoma City
| 
| Tobias Harris (24)
| DeAndre Jordan (21)
| Tobias Harris (6)
| Chesapeake Energy Arena18,203
| 37–31
|-style="background:#fcc;"
| 69
| March 18
| Portland
| 
| Montrezl Harrell (24)
| DeAndre Jordan (16)
| Lou Williams (4)
| Staples Center17,776
| 37–32
|- style="background:#fcc;"
| 70
| March 20
| @ Minnesota
| 
| DeAndre Jordan (18)
| DeAndre Jordan (12)
| Lou Williams (5)
| Target Center16,351
| 37–33
|- style="background:#cfc;"
| 71
| March 21
| @ Milwaukee
| 
| DeAndre Jordan (25)
| DeAndre Jordan (22)
| Lou Williams (8)
| Bradley Center17,916
| 38–33
|- style="background:#fcc;"
| 72
| March 23
| @ Indiana
| 
| Lou Williams (27)
| DeAndre Jordan (11)
| Lou Williams (10)
| Bankers Life Fieldhouse17,923
| 38–34
|- style="background:#cfc;"
| 73
| March 25
| @ Toronto
| 
| Lou Williams (26)
| DeAndre Jordan (14)
| Lou Williams (7)
| Air Canada Centre19,800
| 39–34
|-style="background:#cfc;"
| 74
| March 27
| Milwaukee
| 
| Tobias Harris (19)
| DeAndre Jordan (16)
| Tobias Harris (5)
| Staples Center19,068
| 40–34
|- style="background:#cfc;"
| 75
| March 28
| @ Phoenix
| 
| Tobias Harris (27)
| DeAndre Jordan (15)
| Austin Rivers (8)
| Talking Stick Resort Arena17,005
| 41–34
|- style="background:#fcc;"
| 76
| March 30
| @ Portland
| 
| Lou Williams (23)
| DeAndre Jordan (14)
| Lou Williams (3)
| Moda Center20,013
| 41–35

|-style="background:#fcc;"
| 77
| April 1
| Indiana
| 
| Tobias Harris (21)
| DeAndre Jordan (12)
| Harris, Rivers (7)
| Staples Center15,866
| 41–36
|-style="background:#cfc;"
| 78
| April 3
| San Antonio
| 
| Tobias Harris (29)
| DeAndre Jordan (17)
| Austin Rivers (5)
| Staples Center17,449
| 42–36
|- style="background:#fcc;"
| 79
| April 5
| @ Utah
| 
| Austin Rivers (19)
| DeAndre Jordan (9)
| Rivers, Williams, L. Williams (7)
| Vivint Smart Home Arena18,306
| 42–37
|-style="background:#fcc;"
| 80
| April 7
| Denver
| 
| Lou Williams (24)
| DeAndre Jordan (17)
| Austin Rivers (9)
| Staples Center16,166
| 42–38
|-style="background:#fcc;"
| 81
| April 9
| New Orleans
| 
| Sindarius Thornwell (20)
| DeAndre Jordan (12)
| Sindarius Thornwell (7)
| Staples Center15,742
| 42–39
|-style="background:#fcc;"
| 82
| April 11
| LA Lakers
| 
| Tobias Harris (23)
| DeAndre Jordan (9)
| Austin Rivers (6)
| Staples Center19,068
| 42–40

Player statistics

Regular season
Bold – Leaders (Qualified)
* – Recorded statistics when playing for Los Angeles

|
| 11 || 11 || 30.4 || .403|| .400 || .824 || 4.1 || 2.9 || style="background:#1D428A;color:#FFFFFF;"|1.7 || .5 || 12.2
|-
|
| 6 || 6 || 27.5 || .473|| .111 || style="background:#1D428A;color:#FFFFFF;"|1.000 || 3.7 || 1.8 || .8 || .2 || 9.2
|-
|
| 73 || 1 || 12.1 || .494 || .167 || .661 || 2.4 || .5 || .3 || .1 || 4.2
|-
|
| 48 || 4 || 16.2 || .352 || .278 || .776 || 1.8 || 2.1 || .8 || .1 || 4.8
|-
|
| 21 || 21 || 32.0 || .398 || .324 || .931 || 4.8 || 2.0 || .6 || .5 || 15.3
|-
|
| 76 || 3 || 17.0 || .635 || .143 || .626 || 4.0 || 1.0 || .5 || .7 || 11.0
|-
|
| 32 || 32 || style="background:#1D428A;color:#FFFFFF;"|34.5 || .473 || style="background:#1D428A;color:#FFFFFF;"|.414 || .800 || 6.0 || 3.1 || 1.2 || .6 || 19.3
|-
|
| 74 || 40 || 20.1 || .408 || .339 || .741 || 2.9 || .8 || 1.0 || .8 || 5.4
|-
|
| 77 || style="background:#1D428A;color:#FFFFFF;"|77 || 31.5 || style="background:#1D428A;color:#FFFFFF;"|.645 || .000 || .580 || style="background:#1D428A;color:#FFFFFF;"|15.2 || 1.5 || .5 || style="background:#1D428A;color:#FFFFFF;"|.9 || 12.0
|-
|
| 20 || 0 || 8.3 || .551 || .000 || .788 || 4.4 || .4 || .3 || .3 || 5.9
|-
|
| 61 || 59 || 33.7 || .424 || .378 || .642 || 2.4 || 4.0 || 1.2 || .3 || 15.1
|-
|
| 45 || 36 || 25.2 || .419 || .379 || .848 || 2.8 || 4.6 || .5 || .1 || 9.5
|-
|
| 73 || 17 || 15.8 || .429|| .377 || .670 || 1.9 || .9 || .7 || .3 || 3.9
|-
|
| 30 || 19 || 28.4 || .445 || .250 || .782 || 3.5 || 2.4 || .9 || .4 || 9.7
|-
|
| 38 || 17 || 18.6 || .442 || .282 || .813 || 1.5 || 1.1 || .8 || .3 || 5.5
|-
|
| style="background:#1D428A;color:#FFFFFF;"|79 || 19 || 32.8 || .435 || .359 || .880 || 2.5 || style="background:#1D428A;color:#FFFFFF;"|5.3 || 1.1 || .2 || style="background:#1D428A;color:#FFFFFF;"|22.6
|}

Transactions

Trades

Free agency

Re-signed

Additions

Subtractions

References

Los Angeles Clippers seasons
Los Angeles Clippers
Clippers
Los Angeles Clippers
Clippers
Los Angeles Clippers